F4 Indian Championship is a single-seater motorsport series based in India. The series is run to the FIA's Formula 4 regulations and organized by Racing Promotions Pvt Ltd. The inaugural season will be held in 2023.

The winner of the series earns the right to compete in the next season of Formula Regional Indian Championship for free.

History 
Gerhard Berger and the FIA Singleseater Commission launched Formula 4 in March 2013. The goal of the Formula 4 was to make the ladder to Formula 1 more transparent. Besides sporting and technical regulations, costs are also regulated. A car to compete in this category may not exceed €30,000 and a single season in Formula 4 May not exceed €100,000.

The creation of the series and Formula Regional Indian Championship was teased on 15 August 2021 on the social media of Mumbai Falcons, an Indian team participating in 2021 F3 Asian Championship. The official launch of the championship was held on 19 August 2021.

Format 
The weekend's format is set to have three races per weekend with one single qualifying session. The fastest lap will award pole position for Race 1, while Race 3's grid will be set according to the 2nd fastest lap of every driver at the qualifying session. Race 2's grid will be a reverse grid from Race 1's results.

Car 
The championship will feature Tatuus new Formula 4 car – Tatuus F4-T-421. Abarth was chosen as the engine supplier. Prema Powerteam will be responsible for the technical side of things to ensure parity among all competitors.

Broadcasting 
As with Formula Regional India, Indian F4's organizers are having discussions with international TV channels to broadcast the championship in several countries. For the other countries, the championship will be available on YouTube.

Circuits 
 Bold denotes a current Formula One Circuit.
 Italic denotes a former Formula One Circuit.

References

External links
 

 
Formula racing series
Recurring sporting events established in 2022
Formula 4 series
Auto racing series in India